Calado is a surname. Notable people with the surname include:

Carlos Calado (born 1975), Portuguese athlete
Francisco Calado (1927–2005), Portuguese footballer 
James Calado (born 1989), British racing driver
Joaquim Antônio da Silva Calado (1848–1880), Brazilian composer and flautist
Jorge Calado (born 1942), Mozambican-Portuguese footballer 
José Calado (born 1974), Portuguese footballer

Portuguese-language surnames